The Shadow (Swedish: Skuggan) is a 1953 Swedish drama film directed by Kenne Fant and starring Georg Rydeberg, Eva Dahlbeck and Hugo Björne. It was shot at the Kungsholmen Studios of Nordisk Tonefilm in Stockholm with location shooting at the Stockholm Public Library. The film's sets were designed by the art director Bibi Lindström.

Cast
 Georg Rydeberg as Erik Vender
 Eva Dahlbeck as 	Vivianne
 Pia Arnell as 	Eva
 Björn Bjelfvenstam as 	Frigge Berggren
 Hugo Björne as 	Publisher
 Gunnar Sjöberg as 	Doctor
 Olav Riégo as 	Librarian
 Gull Natorp as 	Woman
 Märta Arbin as 	Nurse Karin
 Olle Hilding as	Berggren
 Per Sjöstrand as 	Press Photographer
 Emmy Albiin as Older Woman with a Signed Book 
 Wiktor Andersson as 	Publishing Company Clerk 
 Per-Axel Arosenius as 	Journalist 
 Bertil Crone as 	Journalist 
 Sven Holmberg as Journalist 
 Hanny Schedin as 	Woman at the Library 
 Rune Stylander as 	Journalist 
 Chris Wahlström as Library Clerk

References

Bibliography 
 Qvist, Per Olov & von Bagh, Peter. Guide to the Cinema of Sweden and Finland. Greenwood Publishing Group, 2000.

External links 
 

1953 films
Swedish drama films
1953 drama films
1950s Swedish-language films
Films directed by Kenne Fant
Films set in Stockholm
1950s Swedish films